The 2012 Libertarian Party presidential primaries allowed voters to indicate non-binding preferences for the Libertarian Party's presidential candidate. These differed from the Republican or Democratic presidential primaries and caucuses in that they did not appoint delegates to represent a candidate at the party's convention to select the party's nominee for the United States presidential election. The party's nominee for the 2012 presidential election was chosen directly by registered delegates at the 2012 Libertarian National Convention, which ran from May 2 to 6, 2012.  The delegates nominated former New Mexico Governor Gary Johnson for President and former judge Jim Gray for Vice President.

Four primaries were held. A total of 22,346 votes were cast in these primaries.

Candidates

Primaries and caucuses

Missouri primary 

In the Missouri primary on February 7, the Libertarian Party had a state-run primary held alongside the Republican and Democratic primaries.

North Carolina primary 

In the North Carolina primary on May 8, the Libertarian Party had a state-run primary held alongside the Republican and Democratic primaries.

Nebraska primary 

In the Nebraska primary on May 15, the Libertarian Party had a state-run primary held alongside the Democratic and Republican primaries.

California primary 

Type: Semi-Closed

In the California primary on June 5,  the Libertarian Party had a state-run primary held alongside those for the Republicans, Democrats, the Green Party, the American Independent Party and the Peace and Freedom Party.

This non-binding primary took place after the 2012 Libertarian National Convention.

2012 National Convention

See also
 Gary Johnson 2012 presidential campaign

Presidential primaries
 2012 Democratic Party presidential primaries
 2012 Green Party presidential primaries
 2012 Republican Party presidential primaries

National Conventions
 2012 Constitution Party National Convention
 2012 Libertarian National Convention
 2012 Green National Convention
 2012 Democratic National Convention
 2012 Republican National Convention

References

Presidential primaries, 2012
2012 United States presidential primaries
Gary Johnson